Schweizer Illustrierte is a weekly illustrated news magazine owned by Swiss media company Ringier.

History and profile
Schweizer Illustrierte was established in 1911 as Schweizer Illustrierte Zeitung (SIZ), and adopted its current name in 1965. The magazine is published weekly in German. It is published by a company with the same name and offers news about stars, opinion leaders and idols. The magazine has no focus on political news.

The headquarters of Schweizer Illustrierte is in Zurich. Stefan Regez is the editor-in-chief of the weekly. Peter Rothenbuehler is among the former editors-in-chief.

The iPad application of Schweizer Illustrierte was launched in 2010.

Circulation
Between July 2004 and June 2005 Schweizer Illustrierte sold 240,240 copies. Its circulation was 232,519 copies between July 2005 and June 2006 and 225,753 copies between July 2006 and June 2007. The circulation of the magazine became 209,121 copies between July 2007 and June 2008. The weekly was the second best-selling magazine in Switzerland with a circulation of 204,856 copies in 2009.

See also
 List of magazines in Switzerland

References

External links

1911 establishments in Switzerland
German-language magazines
Magazines established in 1911
Magazines published in Zürich
News magazines published in Europe
Weekly magazines published in Switzerland
Weekly news magazines